Rowena is an unincorporated community in Early County, in the U.S. state of Georgia. Rowena is named after the character from the Walter Scott novel Ivanhoe.

History
The community was named after one Rowena Collins.

References

Unincorporated communities in Early County, Georgia
Unincorporated communities in Georgia (U.S. state)